HBR may refer to:

Transportation 
 Henley Beach Road in Adelaide, Australia
 Hobart Municipal Airport, in Oklahoma, US
 Hudson Bay Railway (1910), a defunct Canadian railway
 Hudson Bay Railway (1997), a Canadian railway
 Hull and Barnsley Railway, a defunct British railway

Other uses 
 British Honduras at the Olympics, now Belize
 Hanna Barbera Records
 Harvard Business Review
 H. B. Robinson Nuclear Generating Station, in South Carolina, United States
 Henley Boat Races
 Housing Bank of Rwanda
 Hydrogen bromide (HBr)
 Hydrobromic acid, a solution of hydrogen bromide in water